The 1959 World Table Tennis Championships – Swaythling Cup (men's team) was the 25th edition of the men's team championship.  

Japan won the gold medal defeating Hungary 5–1 in the final. China and South Vietnam won bronze medals after elimination from the semi final round.

Medalists

Swaythling Cup tables

Group A

Group B

Group C

Group D

Semifinals

Final

See also
 List of World Table Tennis Championships medalists

References

-